John Gisborne  (c. 1717–1779) was a British politician who sat in the House of Commons from 1775 to 1776 .

Gisborne was the only son of Thomas Gisborne of Derby and his wife Temperance Packer, daughter of Robert Packer MP  of Shillingford, Berkshire. He married Anne Bateman, daughter of William Bateman of Derby. He succeeded his father to Yoxall in 1760.

Gisborne exercised political influence in Derby which he appears to have used on behalf of the Cavendishes for many years. He stood for Derby at a by-election on 30 January 1775 probably supported by Cavendish. He was returned as Member of Parliament, but petitions were submitted complaining that he exercised undue influence over the mayor. As a result of these, he was unseated on 8 February 1776.

Gisborne died on 13 February 1779, aged 62.   His son Thomas was a clergyman and abolitionist, his son John was a poet and his daughter Temperance married Sir Hugh Bateman 1st Baronet.

References

External links
 Olga’s Gallery Joseph Wright of Derby - Anne Bateman, Later Mrs John Gisborne

1710s births
1779 deaths
British MPs 1774–1780
Members of the Parliament of Great Britain for English constituencies
People from Derby
People from Yoxall